Mehdi Reisfirooz (born 1927) was an Iranian film director, actor and film producer. He was born in Tehran.

Filmography

1968: Gerdabe gonah 
1968: Yosef-va-Zolikha / Yusuf İle Züleyha
1961: A Flower in the Salt Land 
1961: The Black Pearl 
1960: I'm Dying to Get Money 
1960: The Promise 
1959: The Wild Angel 
1957: The Rough Adventurers 
1956: Joseph and Potiphar's Wife 
1955: The End of Sufferings 
1953: The Stumble 
1950: Vagabond

External links
 

Iranian film directors
Iranian screenwriters
People from Tehran
Iranian male film actors
Iranian film producers
Possibly living people
1927 births